Alexey Vasilyevich Gordeyev (born 28 February 1955) is a Russian politician who served as Member and Deputy Speaker of the State Duma. Previously he was the Deputy Prime Minister of Russia from 2000 to 2004 and from 2018 to 2020, Governor of Voronezh Oblast from 2009 to 2017 and Agriculture Minister of Russia from 1999 to 2009.

References

External links
  Personal website of Alexey Gordeyev

1955 births
1st class Active State Councillors of the Russian Federation
People from Frankfurt (Oder)
Governors of Voronezh Oblast
United Russia politicians
21st-century Russian politicians
Living people
Grand Crosses with Star and Sash of the Order of Merit of the Federal Republic of Germany
Academicians of the Russian Academy of Agriculture Sciences
Recipients of the Order "For Merit to the Fatherland", 3rd class
Recipients of the Order of Honour (Russia)
Recipients of the Medal of the Order "For Merit to the Fatherland" II class
Agriculture ministers of Russia
Deputy heads of government of the Russian Federation
Seventh convocation members of the State Duma (Russian Federation)
Eighth convocation members of the State Duma (Russian Federation)